Young America is an unincorporated community located in the town of Barton, Washington County, Wisconsin, United States.

Notes

Unincorporated communities in Washington County, Wisconsin
Unincorporated communities in Wisconsin